A Man of No Importance may refer to:

 A Man of No Importance (film)
 A Man of No Importance (musical)

See also
 A Woman of No Importance, a play by Oscar Wilde